ATCA may refer to:

 Atça, a town in Turkey
 Advanced Telecommunications Computing Architecture, a specification for communications equipment
 Aid to the civil authority, military aid to the civil power
 Alien Tort Claims Act, a U.S. statue on jurisdiction
 All Tripura Chess Association, an Indian organisation
 American Theatre Critics Association
 Association of Turkish Cypriots Abroad
 Australia Telescope Compact Array, a radio telescope in New South Wales